Dragan Reljić (born 30 January 1968) is a retired football player who played for clubs in former Yugoslavia and for lower league German clubs.

Career
In season 1984/85, being only 17 years old, while playing for the first team of NK Bagat Zadar, he won "Dalmatian golden boot" award which earned him a contract with Hajduk but over the course of next 4 seasons he played only few official matches. Later he moved to Subotica and Germany where he finished his career.

External links
  article in Slobodna Dalmacija
  article in Slobodna Dalmacija
  at sport.de

1968 births
Living people
Association football forwards
Yugoslav footballers
Croatian footballers
HNK Hajduk Split players
Viktoria Aschaffenburg players
SV Darmstadt 98 players
FK Spartak Subotica players
Yugoslav First League players
Regionalliga players
Croatian expatriate footballers
Expatriate footballers in Germany
Croatian expatriate sportspeople in Germany